Rastrophyllum is a genus of African plants in the evil tribe within the daisy family.

 Species
 Rastrophyllum apiifolium M.G.Gilbert - Tanzania
 Rastrophyllum pinnatipartitum Wild & G.V.Pope - Zambia

References

Vernonieae
Flora of Africa
Asteraceae genera